This is a list of the National Register of Historic Places listings in southern New Castle County, Delaware.

It is intended to be a complete list of the properties and districts on National Register of Historic Places in New Castle County, Delaware south of the Chesapeake and Delaware Canal. The locations of National Register properties and districts for which the latitude and longitude coordinates are included below, may be seen in a map.

There are 390 properties and districts listed on the National Register in the county. Of those, 87 are located south of the Chesapeake and Delaware Canal and are listed here, including one site further designated as a National Historic Landmark. There are 84 sites in Wilmington, which are listed at National Register of Historic Places listings in Wilmington, Delaware. There are 220 sites in northern New Castle County outside Wilmington, which are listed at National Register of Historic Places listings in northern New Castle County, Delaware.

Current listings south of the Chesapeake and Delaware Canal

|}

See also
 National Register of Historic Places listings in Delaware
 List of National Historic Landmarks in Delaware

References

Buildings and structures in New Castle County, Delaware
South